Joshua Robert "Josh" Macdonald (born 25 January 1996) is an  Australian professional footballer, who plays for Wollongong Wolves in the National Premier Leagues NSW. 

Born in Wollongong, Macdonald played youth football with Sydney FC youth and Nottingham Forest before making his senior debut for Western Sydney Wanderers. He returned to Wollongong to play for Wollongong Wolves in 2016. Macdonald signed with Central Coast Mariners in 2018.

Macdonald has represented Australia at youth level, for both the under-17 and under-20 sides, including at the 2012 AFC U-16 Championship

Playing career

Club
In February 2013, Macdonald had a trial with Nottingham Forest. He signed for the club's development side in September 2014. He played a brief stint for Albion Park White Eagles in the Illawarra Premier League in preparation for the move to England. He left Nottingham at the end of the 2014–15 Professional U21 Development League.

Following his release from Forest, Macdonald had a chance meeting with ex-Western Sydney Wanderers football operations manager Matt Phelan, eventually resulting in Macdonald trialling with the Wanderers. On 10 August 2016, Macdonald signed a youth contract to play for the Wanderers National Youth League team. The next day, Macdonald made his professional senior debut for Western Sydney in the 2015 FFA Cup against Brisbane Roar, including winning a penalty in a 1–0 win.

In May 2016, Macdonald signed for hometown side Wollongong Wolves to play in the National Premier Leagues.

International
Macdonald was named in the Australian under-20 squad for 2014 AFC U-19 Championship qualification in October 2013. He made his debut for the side in a 3–0 win over Chinese Taipei. He came on at halftime in the team's next match, a 5–1 loss to Vietnam.

Honours

Club
Sydney FC
 National Youth League: 2013–14

Sydney United
  National Premier Leagues NSW Championship: 2020

References

External links
 

1996 births
Living people
Association football forwards
Australia under-20 international soccer players
Australia youth international soccer players
Australian soccer players
Western Sydney Wanderers FC players
Wollongong Wolves FC players
Sydney United 58 FC players
Central Coast Mariners FC players
A-League Men players
Sportspeople from Wollongong
Australian expatriate sportspeople in England
Expatriate footballers in England
National Premier Leagues players